Bruce Thomas Lander  (born 13 November 1946) was the first Independent Commissioner Against Corruption in South Australia. He was replaced by Ann Vanstone on 2 September 2020. He was formerly a Judge of the Federal Court of Australia.

Early life and education
Bruce Lander was born on 13 November 1946, the son of George and Shylie Hamilton (née Taylor). After completing his secondary education at Unley High School, Lander studied law at the University of Adelaide, graduating in April 1968.

Legal career
Lander began his legal career in 1969 as a Barrister and Solicitor of the Supreme Court of South Australia. He became a partner of Baker McEwin & Co in 1971, two years after his admission. He completed his articles with Baker McEwin & Co. (which later became Minter Ellison), and remained there until 1980. Lander then joined the independent bar and became a founder of Jeffcott Chambers.

He practiced as a solicitor until 1981 when he signed the Bar roll. In 1986 he was appointed as one of Her Majesty's Counsel.

In November 1994, Lander was appointed as a Judge of the Supreme Court of South Australia. He continued serving in this position until he was appointed a Judge of the Federal Court of Australia on 14 July 2003. Later judicial appointments include becoming an additional Judge of the Supreme Court of the Australian Capital Territory in January 2004, a Deputy President of the Administrative Appeals Tribunal in November 2005 and a Judge of the Supreme Court of Norfolk Island in December 2008.

During 2010 and 2011, he was a part-time member of the Australian Law Reform Commission, as part of the Inquiry into Discovery.

On 19 February 2013 it was announced that the Honourable Bruce Lander would be appointed to become South Australia's first Independent Commissioner Against Corruption. He resigned his judicial appointments on 31 August 2013. His term ended on 1 September 2020 and he was replaced by Ann Vanstone.

He has worked closely with the School of Law at Flinders University, from which he received an honorary degree in April 2013.

Bruce lander is currently an Associate Member at Jeffcott Chambers.

Personal life
Bruce Lander married Elizabeth in 1968. They have three daughters and one son, as well as 4 grandchildren. Among his interests, he lists reading, watching football and gardening.

References

1946 births
Judges of the Federal Court of Australia
Judges of the Supreme Court of South Australia
Judges of the Supreme Court of the Australian Capital Territory
20th-century King's Counsel
Adelaide Law School alumni
Living people
Australian King's Counsel
Judges of the Supreme Court of Norfolk Island
20th-century Australian judges
21st-century Australian judges